Le Voyage à Alger  is a 2009 film.

Synopsis
When the War of Independence ends, a widow must find a roof for her six children. Luckily, a Frenchman about to leave offers her the house he is about to vacate. But a high-placed local bureaucrat does not agree to such a gift. After losing all hope of obtaining the property due to the bias of the local authorities, she decides to go to the capital with her children to speak to the president of the Republic. Based on a true story.

Awards
 Fespaco 2011
 Jornadas Cinematográfica de Cartago 2010

External links 

 

2009 films
2009 drama films
Albanian drama films
French drama films
2000s French films